Halulan (also Romanized as Hālūlān; also known as Āshkī Hālūlān, Hārowlān, Hārūlān, and Hārūyān) is a village in Targavar Rural District, Silvaneh District, Urmia County, West Azerbaijan Province, Iran. At the 2006 census, its population was 181, in 35 families.

Name 
According to Vladimir Minorsky, the name Hārūlān is derived from the Mongol tribe called Arulan or Arulat.

References 

Populated places in Urmia County